Coral poaching is the confiscation of highly valued coral species from protected areas for sale as many types of jewellery that could be sold of upwards to $1,800 per gram. The illegal removal of coral is one of the most major environmental issues in many counties of Eastern Asia that destroys valuable ecosystems that harbors marine life. The resulting effect of harvesting coral colonies causes a significant financial loss to the surrounding economies and the destruction of environments.

Background 
Coral is one of the most highly valued pieces of jewelry in many parts of Asia. It has a wholesale market value between $50 to $60 million per year and the value of each piece of jewelry is based on the color, size, and quality of the coral. The most common type of coral harvested that is sold is known as red coral since it is believed that this type of coral is the most precious of all types of coral. The substance is thought to be endowed with enigmatic sanctified properties as well as thought to bring about many cures and remedies. Unfortunately due to these beliefs, coral has been harvested for centuries being passed around and traded well-throughout Eastern Asia.

Since the 8th century, people have poached coral from marine ecosystems in an effort to sell it as jewelry. Coral poaching is one of the most major environmental issues in Asia which continues to destroy many valuable ecosystems and habitats. , it is estimated that about 18.7% of coral reefs are taken care of by marine protected areas and only 2% of these areas are satisfactory enough to prevent further degradation. It is estimated that about $230,000,000 dollars is generated annually from illegal coral poaching. This causes a significant loss of value in the area being poached and has a damaging effect of the marine wildlife that lives in the area. In 1997, it was reported that a number of exporters of precious coral come from countries such as Hong Kong, Taiwan, and Indonesia.

Methods and reasons 

The market for coral is mainly in Asia. Often, coral is poached by fishermen from China, India, or Japan claiming to be on legitimate fishing trips. Divers on these boats will then go down and harvest the coral. The coral will then be taken to be cured and refined into jewelry, which is then sold on the market. Coral is mined for limestone and other construction materials used for bricks, road-fill, and cement for new buildings. It is also taken for the calcium that is in the coral, as well as for decoration in marine aquariums. Jewelry companies in China, Taiwan, and India would be more than willing to pay a hefty price for coral so that it could be made into jewelry for them to sell on the market. With one colony of coral going up to 65,0000 a piece, many fisherman in Asia are willing to risk the punishment for the highly prized piece of jewelry. Illegal confiscations of coral colonies occur along the sea borders between China and Japan.
Coral reefs also contain species that naturally produce important antibacterial and other chemical defense mechanisms that are used in medicine. Some uses of these compounds go into medicine that is used for treatments against cancer, arthritis, heart disease, bacterial infections, viruses and asthma. The breeding grounds for fish, and chemical properties that coral reefs provide make up for a commercial value estimated by the National Marine Fisheries Service to be over $100 million.

Effects on the environment 
Most coral colonies that are harvested take a long time to recover and the effect on the ecosystem surrounding it can be tremendous. It is believed that about one-third of coral reefs worldwide are damaged beyond repair and the rest is under critical condition and threat. One coral site could take a minimum of 10 years to fully recover and could even take up to 50 years to finally be functioning in the environment as it had before. Many marine wildlife communities use the coral for many different things such as: homes, food, and a means for protection against prey. With any coral colony being destroyed, it takes away so much wildlife in the area and makes it almost impossible to preserve for the future. Mining the coral colonies also changes the composition of the sediment in the surrounding area which has a detrimental effect of the marine life living there.

Coral poaching can cause significant amounts of harm to a reef's surrounding areas. Coastlines and fish are known to be protected and preserved by the presence of coral reefs. Coastlines become vulnerable when the power of the open ocean is no longer being dissipated by the structure that coral reefs provide. There are many towns and cities that depend on the defense of coral reefs on their shores, such as Florida Keys, where the shore is lined with homes and businesses. Without the coral reef, the buildings could be at great risk of water damage due to erosion of the shore line. Reefs are also critical to marine biodiversity. Up to 25% of the entire oceans marine life is found in a coral reef ecosystem, and up to 7,000 species depend on the reefs to survive. Scientists are now working on growing coral in farms to later transplant in damaged areas.

Because of their water filtering abilities, coral reefs are also known to help keep the ocean water clean. Corals and sponges filter feed through the water by drawing water in through their pores, consuming the debris, and then releasing the newly filtered water back into the environment. Some studies have shown that sponges in reefs are able to capture sugar floating in the water, absorb them, and shed them to the seabed below feeding snails and bottom feeders. These bottom feeders become food for larger fish, continuing the food chain cycle that larger fish and even humans depend on for food.

Coral reefs, some of the Earth's most remarkable natural structures, have more than aesthetic significance. These tiny animals support lifestyles of thousands of other species, including the species that pose the greatest threat to corals: humans. Many reefs have lost 40-50% of their corals in the past 30 years. Spiny lobsters rely on coral reefs for protection, especially during their vulnerable molting episodes. Hawksbill sea turtles have become critically endangered species and are highly dependent on coral reefs for their food sources, mainly consisting of sponges. Many scientific studies have substantiated that dolphins and whales have extreme emotional intelligence. Sadly, their intellect won't be enough to help these animals if coral reefs are destroyed.

Political issues 
Coral poaching does not only cause harm to the surrounding environments due to the destruction of ecosystems in marine life, but it is also illegal. Those who poach the coral are taking this coral from private and protected areas. The marine life in these areas does not solely rely on the coral but it is a significant benefactor to the life that surrounds them. There are many substances that poachers use that are deadly to corals and the continued use of these poisons and smothers the coral. Coral is a sensitive species and toxic waste gives them no chance to survive and flourish in the ecosystem. Poaching of reef fish also contributes to a decrease of corals worldwide, because the fish graze the corals  which in turn keeps the corals healthy.

In some areas, coral reefs are a big tourist attraction. Losing the coral means losing money, and losing jobs in the community. For example, most of the estimated 5 million people who visit the Florida Keys each year contribute to the economy the coral reefs provide. The Keys average about 2.4 billion dollars in sales from tourism and ocean recreation. More than half of the jobs in the community depend on a healthy ocean to continue a successful tourist attraction.

Since the illegal removal of coral across Asia has such a huge impact on the environment and marine life, government officials in Japan have started taking action against illegal poaching of coral in Japanese waters. Recently, Japanese Prime Minister Shinzō Abe met with Chinese Communist Party general secretary Xi Jinping in regards to taking action and making efforts against Chinese coral poachers working in Japanese waters. The illegal removal of coral in the area is causing maritime tensions between these two nations due to high demand for Japanese coral jewelry in China. The main concern for the Japanese government regarding the illegal mining of coral is that coral mining creates a tremendous long-term loss to a society since the removal causes loss in fisheries significance, seaside security, and vacation industry in the area.

Prevention 
Many nations throughout the world are working towards preventing illegal poachers from mining coral in shallow-reef areas that harbor many marine wildlife and habitats. Japan punishes anyone illegally poaching coral in their waters by sentencing perpetrators to up to six months imprisonment or a ¥300,000 fine. In the United States, a group known as SeaWeb has worked with other agencies to prevent illegal poaching as well as the preservation of coral colonies.

Some possible methods to eliminate the illegal removal of precious coral colonies include: 
Improve guidelines of coral reef trade that requires demonstration of maintainable use and assortment, for both domestic and international trade.
Establish "no-take" Marine Protected Areas as environmental reserves.
Create administration plans that limit harvesting to a supportable level.
Prevent destruction of coral reefs through legal action and execution.
Encourage certification schemes which give sustainable gathered coral products a market benefit, such as the Marine Aquarium Council (MAC).
Teach consumers of coral reef products and the consequences of their choices.
Educate resident communities on maintainable fishing procedures and alternative livings.

Preventing fisherman from illegally harvesting coral in many parts of the world, will allow coral colonies to repopulate and provide the necessary ecosystems for many marine life forms that depend on corals for survival.

See also 
Wildlife management
Wildlife smuggling

References 

Poaching